The Fourth Federal Electoral District of Chihuahua (IV Distrito Electoral Federal de Chihuahua) is one of the 300 Electoral Districts into which Mexico is divided for the purpose of elections to the federal Chamber of Deputies and one of nine such districts in the state of Chihuahua.

It elects one deputy to the lower house of Congress for each three-year legislative period, by means of the first past the post system.

District territory
Under the 2005 districting scheme, Chihuahua's Fourth District covers the southern portion of Ciudad Juárez.

The district's head town (cabecera distrital), where results from individual polling stations are gathered together and collated, is the city of  Ciudad Juárez.

Previous districting schemes

1996–2005 district
Almost exactly the same as the current configuration.

1979–1996 district
As at present, between 1979 and 1996 the Fourth District covered a portion of the Ciudad Juárez urban area.

Deputies returned to Congress from this district 

XLVIII Legislature
 1970–1971:  Armando González Soto (PRI)
 1971–1973:  Antonio Barrio Mendoza (PRI)
XLIX Legislature
 1973–1976:
L Legislature
 1976–1979:  Juan Ernesto Madera Prieto (PRI)
LI Legislature
 1979–1982:  Miguel Lerma Candelaria (PRI)
LII Legislature
 1982–1985:  Francisco Rodríguez Pérez (PRI)
LIII Legislature
 1985–1988:  Oscar Luis Rivas Muñoz (PAN)
LIV Legislature
 1988–1991:  Santiago Rodríguez del Valle (PAN)
LV Legislature
 1991–1994:  Oscar Nieto Burciaga (PRI)
LVI Legislature
 1994–1997:  Miguel Lucero Palma (PRI)
LVII Legislature
 1997–2000:  Carlos Camacho Alcázar (PAN)
LVIII Legislature
 2000–2003:  Arturo Meza de la Rosa (PAN)
LIX Legislature
 2003–2006:  Miguel Lucero Palma (PRI)
LX Legislature
 2006–2007:  Víctor Valencia de los Santos (PRI)
 2007:  Octavio Fuentes Téllez (PRI)
 2007–2008:  Víctor Valencia de los Santos (PRI)
 2008–2009:  Octavio Fuentes Téllez (PRI)

Results

References and notes 

Federal electoral districts of Mexico
Chihuahua (state)